John Henri Isaac Browere (1790–1834) was an artist in New York in the early 19th century. He created life masks of Thomas Jefferson, Gilbert Stuart, Lafayette, John Quincy Adams, Edwin Forrest, Issac Van Wart, John Paulding, David Williams and other notables.

References

1790 births
1834 deaths
American portrait artists
19th-century American sculptors
19th-century American male artists
American male sculptors
Sculptors from New York (state)